McComb High School is a public school in McComb, Mississippi, United States, serving 740 students in grades 912, as of 2017.

Athletics
McComb High School offers multiple sports, including baseball, football, and basketball.

Notable alumni

 Woodie Assaf, weatherman at WLBT television in Jackson from 1953 to 2001, and was reported to be the weatherman with the longest tenure at the same station in U.S. broadcasting history
 Adrian Brown, former MLB player 
 Jackie Butler, former NBA player 
 Cooper Carlisle, former NFL player
 Perry Carter, former NFL player
 Jarrod Dyson, MLB player
 Bobby Felder, former NFL player
 Vasti Jackson, blues musician.
 Abe Mickal, college football All-American
 David Myers, American politician
 Whitney Rawlings, current mayor of McComb, Mississippi
 Pete Young, former MLB player
 Charvarius Ward, NFL player
 Bobby Lounge, Blues Musician

Clubs and activities
The school offers multiple clubs and activities including Spanish Club, Drama Club, and Art Club.

References

External links

Public high schools in Mississippi
Schools in Pike County, Mississippi
McComb, Mississippi